Wadi Jallal is a village located in the Al Wakrah municipality of Qatar.

As the area is typified by a wadi (dry river-valley) which would flood during heavy rains, it was named "Wadi Jallal"; the second constituent being derived from the Arabic "jalaa", meaning "to wash away".

References

Populated places in Al Wakrah